Colin Peacock (born 1960) is a former Scottish international lawn bowler.

Bowls career
Peacock has represented Scotland at the Commonwealth Games, in the triples event at the 2006 Commonwealth Games.

He became the Scottish champion after winning the singles title at the 1994 Scottish National Bowls Championships, bowling for Marchmount BC, Dumfries.

References

Scottish male bowls players
1960 births
Living people
Bowls players at the 2006 Commonwealth Games
Bowls European Champions